Andrew Stanley Keyworth (2 December 1923–25 July 1996) was a New Zealand master mariner. He was born in Auckland, Auckland, New Zealand on 2 December 1923.

Long-time captain for the Union Steam Ship Company of New Zealand, Keyworth is famous for his rescue of the Union Rotorua while captaining the Union Rotoiti in 1980.

References

1923 births
1996 deaths
New Zealand sailors
People from Auckland